The Association for the Study of Australian Literature (ASAL) is an Australian organisation which promotes the creation and study of Australian literature and literary culture especially through the interaction of Australian writers with teachers and students. It administers several awards, holds a yearly conference, publishes a newsletter and journal, and has sponsored several publications.

Awards 
The Australian Literature Society, which had been formed in Melbourne in 1899, merged into ASAL which, since 1982, has administered the ALS Gold Medal. In addition, ASAL administers the following awards:

 Mary Gilmore Award
 A.D. Hope Prize, awarded annually for the best paper delivered by a postgraduate student to the ASAL annual conference
 Walter McRae Russell Award, for the best book of literary scholarship on an Australian subject published in the preceding two calendar years; before 1994, it was awarded to a young or unestablished author for an outstanding work of literary scholarship
 the Magarey Medal for biography, a biennial prize for the best published biographical writing by a female author on an Australian subject in the preceding two years
 the A.A. Phillips Award, an occasional award for a work or the work of an author which the ASAL executive considers an outstanding contribution to Australian literature or literary studies

History 
In May 1978, writer and academic Mary Lord organized the inaugural ASAL conference at Monash University. At this conference, the Association adopted its constitution and appointed A.D. Hope and Judith Wright as patrons.

Life members 
ASAL has conferred life membership upon Clem Christesen, Mary Lord, Judith Wright, Thea Astley, Peter Cowan, Rosemary Dobson, Gwen Harwood, Eric Irvin, Ken Stewart, Julian Croft, and Ian McLaren.

Publications 
From October 1978 until October 2000, ASAL published 43 issues of a bulletin, Notes and Furphies. The bulletin was merged with ASAL's publication of conference proceedings to form the Journal of the Association for the Study of Australian Literature.

ASAL initiated the ASAL Literary Studies Series of specialist monographs on Australian writing. The following volumes have appeared:
 Paul Genoni, Subverting the Empire: Explorers and Exploration in Australian Fiction (2004) 
 Anne Pender, Christina Stead: Satirist (2002) 
 Susan Lever, Real Relations: The Feminist Politics of Form in Australian Fiction (2000) 
 Alison Bartlett, Jamming the Machinery: Contemporary Australian Women’s Writing (1998) 
 Leigh Dale, The English Men: Professing Literature in Australian Universities (1997) 
 David Carter, A Career in Writing: Judah Waten and the Cultural Cringe (1997) 

Other publications ASAL has sponsored are:
 The Oxford Literary Guide to Australia (1987, revised 1993)
 the Penguin New Literary History of Australia (1988) and
 the Macquarie Dictionary of Australian Quotations (1990).

References

External links 
 

Learned societies of Australia
1977 establishments in Australia
Organizations established in 1977